Sa'adiya Omar Bello (OON) is a Nigerian academic and professor of Hausa Literature at Usmanu Danfodiyo University. In 2022, she was awarded a National honor in the  Order of the Niger category. She holds a Ph.D from the same university. Between 2000 and 2005, she was the Director at Cibiyar Nazarin Hausa (2000-2005) & (2013-2017)

References 


Nigerian academics
Living people